Cerogria is a genus of beetles belonging to the family Tenebrionidae.

References

Lagriinae
Tenebrionidae genera